The 2nd Division was an infantry division of the British Army, which was first formed in 1809 and finally disbanded in 2012. The division was commanded by a general officer commanding (GOC). In this role, he would receive orders from a level above him in the chain of command, and then use the forces within the division to undertake the mission assigned. In addition to directing the tactical battle the division was involved in, the GOC oversaw a staff and the administrative, logistical, medical, training, and discipline of the division. The division had 65 different permanent GOCs over its history that spanned 203 years.

Prior to 1809, the British Army did not use divisional formations. As the British military grew in size during the Napoleonic Wars, the need arose for such an implementation in order to better organise forces for administrative, logistical, and tactical reasons. The 2nd Division was formed on 18 June 1809 by Lieutenant-General Arthur Wellesley, and served in the Peninsular War (part of the Napoleonic Wars). After the Peninsular War ended in 1814, the division was disbanded only to be re-raised the following year when the War of the Seventh Coalition broke out. The division fought at the Battle of Waterloo, and played a pivotal role in the defeat of the final French attack of the day. The division's light infantry brigade flanked and attacked the French Imperial Guard, causing them to falter, and then retreat. The brigade then spearheaded the British general advance after the retreating French forces. In December 1818, the division was disbanded once again.

During the mid to late 19th century, several formations bore the name "2nd Division". The ones that fought in the Crimean War and the Second Boer War were considered to be part of the same lineage as the two that fought in the Napoleonic Wars by Everard Wyrall, who compiled the 2nd Division's First World War official history. Reformed in 1854, the division fought in the Crimean War against the Russian Empire. It served throughout the siege of Sevastopol, had a critical role in the Battle of Inkerman, and was stood down at the end of the war in 1856. A new 2nd Division was mobilised in 1899, for action in the Second Boer War. It took part in all the battles that comprised the Relief of Ladysmith, and was broken-up at the end of 1900 when conventional warfare ended. This allowed the division's personnel to be reassigned to mobile columns or to garrison towns, in an effort to combat the guerrilla tactics that the Boers employed.

In 1902, the division was reformed as a permanent formation. It was based at Aldershot, in southern England, prior to the First World War and during the inter-war period. In 1914, the division deployed to France shortly after the war started as part of the British Expeditionary Force. It served on the Western Front between 1914 and 1918. During the Second World War, the division was again deployed to France in the opening stages of the war. In the subsequent Battle of France, the division was forced to evacuate back to England. In 1942, the formation was transported to India, and subsequently fought in Burma in 1944 and 1945. In the post-war years, it formed part of the British Army of the Rhine in Germany. In 1976, the infantry division was transformed into an armoured formation based in Germany, but was disbanded at the end of 1982. The 2nd Division was then reformed in York, England, in 1983. Following the end of the Cold War, the division was once again disbanded. It was re-raised in 1994 as a training formation and maintained this role until 2012, when it was disbanded for the final time.

General officer commanding

See also
 List of orders of battle for the British 2nd Division
 List of Victoria Cross recipients from the British 2nd Division

Notes

References

 
 
 
 
 
 
 
 
 
 
 
 
 
 
 
 
 
 
 
 
 
 
 
 
 
 
 
 
 
 
 
 
 
 
 
 
 

British Army personnel by war
British Army personnel of the Napoleonic Wars
British Army personnel of the Peninsular War
British Army personnel of the Crimean War
British Army personnel of the Second Boer War
British Army personnel of World War I
British Army personnel of World War II
British Army general officer commanding lists